Antoine L'Estage  is the most successful Canadian rally driver ever. He has won national championships in both the Canada and the USA. He lives in St-Jean-sur-Richelieu, Québec.

Rally
Antoine L'Estage was born into the world of rally. As a young boy, he and his siblings would watch their father compete as a driver. He started racing in 1995 at the Rallye de Quebec in regional events. He won Rookie of the year for the 2001 season for the Canadian Rally Championship. He won the Canadian championship in 2006, 2007, and eight in a row from 2010 to 2017, coming second to Patrick Richard in 2004, 2008 and 2009. In 2011, he broke the record of most wins at Défi St-Agathe Rallye (previously set by John Buffum) when he won the event for the sixth time in seven years. In 2014 he became the first 7-time champion as well as the first driver in the history of the CRC to win all six events in the same season.

Beginning the 2015 season, Antoine L'Estage joined the Subaru Rally Team Canada (SRTC) and became the driver of the SRTC 2015 Subaru WRX STI with anticipation of being the quickest car, driver and team to ever compete in the CRC. Subaru Rally Team Canada is managed in cooperation with Rocket Rally Racing (RRR) and Patrick Richard, based out of Squamish, BC. The SRTC 2015 Subaru WRX STI was developed at the RRR facility.

Antoine also competed in the USA-based Rally America series from 2006 to 2015. He won the North American Rally Cup in 2007, 2008, and from 2010 to 2014, coming second to Andrew Comrie-Picard in 2009. In 2010, Antoine ended Travis Pastrana's four-year reign over the Rally America championship. He later claimed the North American and the Canadian Rally Championships and secured the Triple Crown for 2010 by winning all three titles in the same year. In 2011 and 2012 Antoine completed the Rally America series as runner-up behind former British champion David Higgins. In 2013 he rented a MML Sports built WRC-spec Mitsubishi Lancer for the Oregon Trail, resulting in a spectacularcrash  He competed three times in Rally Car Racing at X Games.  He raced his Hyundai Tiburon for X Games 13, borrowed a Rockstar Energy Subaru for X Games 14, finishing ninth, and then he took his Mitsubishi Evo X to a Bronze medal finish at X Games 16 in 2010. He has also been a test driver on a show in Quebec called Le Guide de l'Auto.

Canadian Rally Championship Results
As of November 2015, Antoine L'Estage became the most successful Canadian rally driver ever, overtaking Taisto Heinonen at 5590 lifetime pts, and tying with John Buffum for most wins at 43. L'Estage went on to win 4 events in the 2016 season on his way to his ninth Canadian Championship, and he was inducted into the Canadian Motorsport Hall of Fame in October 2016.

Complete Rally America results

Personal life

See also
Canadian Rally Championship
Rally America
Mitsubishi Evo

References

External links

https://web.archive.org/web/20111026081156/http://espn.go.com/action/athlete/_/id/44843/antoine-l%27estage
https://web.archive.org/web/20120425081343/http://www.coyoterallye.com/profile
http://www.rallyracingnews.com/cars/crc-standing.html

1973 births
Living people
Canadian rally drivers
Place of birth missing (living people)
People from Saint-Jean-sur-Richelieu
Sportspeople from Quebec